Nadsal  is a village in the southern state of Karnataka, India. It is located in the Udupi taluk of Udupi district in Karnataka.

Demographics
As of 2001 India census, Nadsal had a population of 10987 with 5245 males and 5742 females.

See also
 Udupi
 Districts of Karnataka

References

External links
 http://Udupi.nic.in/

Villages in Udupi district